James Phillip Rendell (born 24 January 1980) is a former English cricketer.  Rendell was a right-handed batsman who bowled right-arm off break.  He was born in Bristol.

Rendell represented the Gloucestershire Cricket Board in List A cricket.  His debut List A match came against the Yorkshire Cricket Board in the 1999 NatWest Trophy.  From 1999 to 2002, he represented the Board in 4 List A matches, the last of which came against the Surrey Cricket Board in the 1st round of the 2003 Cheltenham & Gloucester Trophy which was played in 2002.  In his 4 List A matches, he took 7 wickets at a bowling average of 20.85, with best figures of 3/36.

References

External links
James Rendell at Cricinfo
James Rendell at CricketArchive

1980 births
Living people
Cricketers from Bristol
English cricketers
Gloucestershire Cricket Board cricketers